Tanzalarm is a German television series. The name translates into "dance alarm". It was first aired in 2004, and is a joint venture between the KiKA and ZDF.

See also
List of German television series

External links
 

2004 German television series debuts
2010s German television series
German children's television series
German music television series
German-language television shows